My Son, My Son! is a 1940 American drama film based on a novel by the same name written by Howard Spring and directed by Charles Vidor. It was nominated for an Academy Award for Best Art Direction by John DuCasse Schulze.

Cast

 Madeleine Carroll as Livia Vaynol
 Brian Aherne as William Essex
 Louis Hayward as Oliver Essex
 Laraine Day as Maeve O'Riorden
 Henry Hull as Dermot O'Riorden
 Josephine Hutchinson as Nellie Moscrop Essex
 Sophie Stewart as Sheila O'Riorden
 Bruce Lester as Rory O'Riorden
 Scotty Beckett as Oliver as a Child
 Brenda Henderson as Maeve as a Child
 Teddy Moorwood as Rory as a Child
 May Beatty as Annie
 Stanley Logan as The Colonel
 Lionel Belmore as Mr. Moscrop
 Mary Gordon as Mrs. Mulvaney
 David Clyde as Drayman
 Vesey O'Davoren as Parker, Butler
 Pat Flaherty as Joe Baxter
 Victor Kendall as Pogson
 Mary Field as Betsy, First Maid
 Audrey Manners as Second Maid
 Sibyl Harris as First Landlady
 Connie Leon as Second Landlady

Production
Edward Small bought film rights to the book for $50,000 in part because he thought it would make an ideal vehicle for his new star, Louis Hayward.

Plans to make the film were temporarily halted due to World War II.

References

External links

My Son, My Son! on Lux Radio Theater: March 11, 1940

1940 films
1940 drama films
American drama films
American black-and-white films
1940s English-language films
Films directed by Charles Vidor
Films produced by Edward Small
1940s American films